Wayuu, or Guajiro, is a major Arawakan language spoken by 400,000 indigenous Wayuu people in northwestern Venezuela and northeastern Colombia on the Guajira Peninsula and surrounding Lake Maracaibo. 

There were an estimated 300,000 speakers of Wayuu in Venezuela in 2012 and another 120,000 in Colombia in 2008, approximately half the ethnic population of 400,000 in Venezuela (2011 census) and 400,000 in Columbia (2018 census). Smith (1995) reports that a mixed Guajiro–Spanish language is replacing Wayuu in both countries. However, Campbell (1997) could find no information on this.

Recent developments
To promote bilingual education among Wayuu and other Colombians, the Kamusuchiwoꞌu Ethno-educative Center came up with the initiative of creating the first illustrated Wayuunaiki–Spanish, Spanish–Wayuunaiki dictionary.

In December 2011, the Wayuu Tayá Foundation and Microsoft presented the first ever dictionary of technology terms in the Wayuu language, after having developed it for three years with a team of technology professionals and linguists.

Dialects
The two main dialects are Wüinpümüin and Wopumüin, spoken in the northeast and southwest of the peninsula, respectively. These dialects are mutually intelligible, as they are minimally distinct. The extinct Guanebucan language may actually have been a dialect of Wayuu.

Phonology

All vowels can either occur in short or long versions, since vowel length is distinctive.

 is a lateral flap pronounced with the tongue just behind the position for the Spanish , and with a more lateral airflow.

Grammar

The personal pronouns of Wayuu are

Vocabulary examples
The following are examples of Wayuu.
  'good morning'
  'good afternoon'
  'good night'
  'how are you (singular)?'
  'how are you (plural)?'
  'rabbit'
  'grass'
  'clay jar'

 itself comes from  'human being' and the suffix , from  'speech' ('word' or 'language').

Notes

External links

 
 WayuuTribe.com -About the Wayuu People and Wayuu Art
 Brief explanation of the Wayuunaiiki language
 Spanish-Wayuunaiki dictionary

 
Arawakan languages
Indigenous languages of the South American Northeast
Languages of Colombia
Languages of Venezuela